Millington is an unincorporated community located within Long Hill Township in Morris County, New Jersey, United States.

Geography
The area is served as United States Postal Service ZIP code 07946. Other communities in Long Hill Township include Gillette, Stirling, and the hamlet of Meyersville.

It borders the southern side of the Great Swamp National Wildlife Refuge with access to Lord Stirling Park. The Passaic River forms its western and southern border. The Raptor Trust, a famous bird rehabilitation and education center within the Great Swamp is also inside the town limits.

History
Clover Hill Swimming Club was located there. It lost a 1966 civil rights case. In 2013, the lake is not sanitary for swimming. The only activity that takes place at this lake now, 2013, is fishing.

Demographics

As of the 2010 United States Census, the population for ZIP Code Tabulation Area 07946 was 3,144

Education
Students in public school attend the Long Hill Township School System for grades K-8 and attend Watchung Hills Regional High School in Somerset County for grades 9-12. Millington School is the only active school still located in the town. It houses grades 2-5 and had an enrollment of 505 students as of the 2005-06 school year.

The Town Hall used to be used as the old school house of the town, originally built in the 19th century.

Infrastructure

Rail
The town has a train stop on the Gladstone Branch of the NJ Transit rail line, Millington Station. Millington Station was built in 1901, after the West Line Railroad was extended from Summit to Bernardsville during the years 1870–71. Millington Station was entered into the National Register of Historic Places on June 22, 1984. Another building on the register is the Boyle/Hudspeth-Benson House. See List of Registered Historic Places in Morris County, New Jersey for other examples in the area.

Economy
Garden State Fireworks, founded in 1890, is located there.

Millington Savings Bank started as Millington Building and Loan in 1911 in the town and has grown to other branches in the area.

Notable people

People who were born in, residents of, or otherwise closely associated with Millington include:
 Jack H. Jacobs (born 1945), Medal of Honor recipient in 1969 for his heroic actions during the Vietnam War.
 Robert Tappan Morris (born 1965), computer scientist and entrepreneur best known for creating the Morris Worm in 1988, considered the first computer worm on the Internet.
 Bill Murray, defensive tackle for the New England Patriots.

Gallery

References

External links
fieldtripcom The Raptor Trust
Google maps
Long Hill Schools
Long Hill History
 Weather Averages

Long Hill Township, New Jersey
Unincorporated communities in Morris County, New Jersey
Unincorporated communities in New Jersey